Grant Langston (born July 19, 1966 in Gadsden, Alabama) is an American country singer-songwriter.

Langston's music has been featured in a variety of TV shows and films including: HBO's True Blood, ABC TV's Army Wives, the Mike Figgis film Suspension of Disbelief, and others. He has opened dates for Dale Watson, Band of Heathens, Ben Harper, Drivin' and Cryin', Wayne Hancock and Otis Taylor.

Langston currently resides in Los Angeles.

Langston was also an early employee and shareholder in the online dating service, eHarmony.com.

Discography
All This and Pecan Pie (2000)
Chinese Fire Drill (2001)
Road Side Service (2004)
Koreatown (2006)
Live in Bakersfield (2007)
Stand Up Man (2009)
Working Until I Die (2012)

References

External links
Official website

1966 births
Living people
Musicians from Gadsden, Alabama
American country singer-songwriters
American male singer-songwriters
Auburn University alumni
Singer-songwriters from Alabama